Agostinho Mondlane (born 21 November 1959) is a Mozambican politician who has served as Mozambique's Minister of Defence from 2014 to 2015. Previously he was Deputy Minister of Defence from 2007 to 2014.

References

1959 births
Living people
Mozambican economists
FRELIMO politicians
Defence ministers of Mozambique
Eduardo Mondlane University alumni
Alumni of the University of London
People from Maputo